The austral pygmy owl (Glaucidium nana) is a species of owl in the family Strigidae. It is found in Argentina and Chile.

Taxonomy and systematics

The austral pygmy owl has sometimes been treated as a subspecies of ferruginous pygmy owl (Glaucidium brasilianum) but DNA studies and other data support its being a species in its own right. It is monotypic.

Description
Males weigh  and females . It has gray-brown and red morphs and intergrades between them. Adults of both morphs have a pale grayish brown face with dark flecks, whitish "brows" over pale yellow eyes, and black "false eyes" on the nape. The gray-brown morph's upperparts are dark grayish brown with whitish dots of variable size and shape. The tail is also dark grayish brown with narrow buffy bars. The throat is white, the sides of the upper breast dark grayish brown, and the underparts off-white with dark grayish brown streaks. The red morph has a similar pattern but reddish brown replaces the dark grayish brown.

Distribution and habitat

The austral pygmy owl is found from approximately Valparaíso Province in Chile and Neuquén Province in western Argentina south to the tip of Tierra del Fuego. It inhabits a variety of landscapes from city parks and farmland with scattered trees to deciduous forests and thickets, evergreen shrublands, temperate and southern beech (Nothofagus) forests, and Patagonian scrub/steppe.

Behavior

Feeding

The austral pygmy owl is primarily diurnal but is also active at night. It is a solitary hunter that sallies from perches to capture insects, birds, mammals, and reptiles. It has been documented taking birds almost double its own weight.

Breeding

The austral pygmy owl usually nests in a tree cavity but has also been documented using holes in earthen banks. They lay a clutch of three to five eggs between September and November, and the female alone incubates them.

Vocalization

The austral pygmy owl has five primary vocalizations. Pairs maintain contact with "a whistle with 6 to 7 notes/sec described as huj-huj-huj-huj-huj-huj". Their territorial call is "a sharp trill described as truie-truie-yi-yi". Nestlings make "soft metallic chirps trigigigirrr or trigigick". Both sexes make a courtship call, "a whistle...described as tiririi-tiririi, and an undefined call rendered as diud or diuh".

Status

The IUCN has assessed the austral pygmy owl as being of Least Concern. Though its population has not been quantified, the species is "reported to be the most abundant owl in Chile". In agricultural areas it is persecuted because its nocturnal calls are interpreted as an ill omen.

References

External links
Austral Pygmy Owl videos on the Internet Bird Collection
Stamps (for Chile) with RangeMap
Austral Pygmy Owl photo gallery VIREO Photo-High Res
Photo-Medium Res; Article prba.com

austral pygmy owl
Birds of Chile
Birds of Patagonia
Birds of Tierra del Fuego
austral pygmy owl
Taxonomy articles created by Polbot
Fauna of the Valdivian temperate rainforest